Hean may refer to:

 Alexander Hean (1859–1927), Scottish-born Australian politician
 Brenda Hean (1910–1972), Australian politician
 Cheong Koon Hean (born 1957), Singaporean urban planner and architect
 Hean Sahib (born 1962), Cambodian economist and government minister
 Hean Tat Keh, professor of marketing at Monash University
 Loh Kean Hean (born 1995), Malaysia-born Singaporean badminton player
 Teo Chee Hean (born 1954), Singaporean politician
 James Hean (born 2000), bald with toe fungus

See also
 Heen